Entelognathus primordialis (“primordial complete jaw”) is a maxillate placoderm from the late Silurian (Ludlow epoch) of Qujing, Yunnan, 419 million years ago.

A team led by Min Zhu of the Academy of Sciences' Institute of Vertebrate Paleontology and Paleoanthropology in Beijing discovered the intact, articulated fossil in rock formations at Xiaoxiang reservoir.

Specimen and taxonomy
The holotype of E. primordialis is the uncrushed and mostly intact anterior half of an individual with the articulating head and trunk armor preserved in three dimensions. In overall form, the animal resembles primitive arthrodires, but the anatomy of the jaws strongly suggests the anatomies of bony fish and tetrapods. Specifically, this is the first stem gnathostome with dermal marginal jaw bones. These bones are the premaxilla, maxilla, and dentary. Most known placoderms had simple beak-like jaws made of bone plates.

The researchers' cladistic diagram suggests that E. primordialis forms a polytomy with arthrodires, ptyctodonts, and all advanced gnathostomes (namely bony fish, tetrapods, acanthodians, and chondrichthyes).

Etymology
The generic name translates as "complete jaw", referring to how the animal had a complete set of dermal marginal jaw bones. The specific name translates as "primordial".

Evolutionary significance
Prior to the discovery of Entelognathus, scientists assumed that the last common ancestor of jawed vertebrates was a shark-like animal, with no distinct jawbones, and that modern jaws evolved in early bony fishes. This discovery shows that modern jaws evolved earlier. It is possible that Chondrichthyes started with distinct jaws and then dispensed with them. This has been called the earliest known animal with what looks like a face.

See also 

 Bianchengichthys
 Qilinyu
 Silurolepis

References

External links
 National Geographic - Fish fossil has oldest known face, may influence evolution
 Reuters - Fossil fish find in China fills in evolutionary picture
 Discover Magazine - First jawed fish had one ugly face
 Scientist hails 'jaw-dropping' fish fossil discovery (BBC, 2013-09-27)

Placoderm genera
Placoderms of Asia
Silurian fish of Asia
Placodermi enigmatic taxa
Prehistoric animals of China
Transitional fossils
Fossil taxa described in 2013
2013 in China